Hans Parrel (born September 14, 1944 in Utrecht) is a former water polo player from the Netherlands, who competed in two consecutive Summer Olympics for his native country, starting in 1968. In Mexico City and Munich he finished in seventh position with the Dutch Men's Water Polo Team.

References

External links
 Dutch Olympic Committee

1944 births
Living people
Dutch male water polo players
Olympic water polo players of the Netherlands
Water polo players at the 1968 Summer Olympics
Water polo players at the 1972 Summer Olympics
Sportspeople from Utrecht (city)
20th-century Dutch people